Herpes is a genus of beetles belonging to the family Curculionidae.

The species of this genus are found in Southern Europe.

Species:
 Herpes porcellus Lacordaire, 1863

References

Curculionidae
Curculionidae genera